Joseph D. Haussler (May 19, 1902 – September 9, 1989) was an American politician in the state of Washington. He served in the Washington House of Representatives from 1963 to 1965 and from 1967 to 1977.

References

1989 deaths
1902 births
People from Alvin, Texas
Democratic Party members of the Washington House of Representatives
20th-century American politicians